Ching Ho Cheng (December 26, 1946 – May 25, 1989) was a contemporary artist who lived and painted in New York City during the 1970s and 1980s. His work consists of four distinct periods: Psychedelics, Gouache, Torn Works and the Alchemical Series, all primarily executed on paper. As an artist who was well versed in world literature, it is evident that his body of work has been influenced by Egyptian mythology as well as his following of Taoism, which embodied his beliefs in the universal renewal of life.

Life and work

An American of Chinese descent, Ching Ho Cheng was born in Havana, Cuba, in 1946. Cheng was the son of Chiang Kai-shek's last ambassador to Cuba. During the mid-1960s he studied painting at the Cooper Union School of Art in New York City, and during the early seventies lived in Paris and Amsterdam, where, in 1976, he had his first one-man show. Cheng returned to New York that same year and checked into the Chelsea Hotel intending to remain for two months; he lived and worked there until his death in May 1989. Rosa von Praunheim portrayed Cheng in his studio in the Chelsea Hotel for his award-winning film Tally Brown, New York (1979).

Ching Ho Cheng created artwork from torn paper. To create these variously scaled abstract pieces, Cheng applied iron powder to torn paper which was sealed with waterproof layers of gesso, mat medium and modelling paste employed to create a sense of relief. He used a special catalyst to begin a lengthy chemical process of transforming the iron into rust. The paper was soaked in water for days and dried, acquiring a hard surface. Cheng controlled the process by deciding when to remove the paper from the bath. Cheng would sometimes resoak the paper in order to obtain the desired surface and textural coloration. He manipulated viscous surfaces with the smaller works and hoped to achieve a greater impasto with the larger torn paper pieces, as these pieces had a tendency to break if too heavily laden.

At a time when Asian-Americans were nearly absent from the contemporary art scene, Cheng was highly regarded by peers and by prominent art historians such as Gert Schiff and Henry Geldzahler, the first curator of twentieth-century art at the Metropolitan Museum of Art. Notable collectors of his work are Miles Davis, Louise Fletcher, Aldo Cipullo, Princess Caroline of Monaco, Alfonso Ossorio, Peggy Cooper Cafritz, Countess Claude de Lesse and others. Cheng exhibited his work extensively in New York and overseas.

Archives

Ching Ho Cheng's personal letters, photos, drawings and artifacts are housed at the Smithsonian Archives of American Art in Washington, DC.

Selected collections

 Whitney Museum of American Art
 Hirshhorn Museum and Sculpture Garden
 Cleveland Museum of Art
 The Phillips Collection
 Smithsonian American Art Museum
 Brooklyn Museum
 Montclair Art Museum
 Detroit Institute of Arts
 Minneapolis Institute of Art
 Grey Art Gallery
 Everson Museum of Art
 Smith College Museum of Art

References

1989 deaths
1946 births
American artists
American people of Taiwanese descent
American people of Chinese descent
People from Havana
People from Chelsea, Manhattan
Cuban emigrants to the United States
Cooper Union alumni